Sagittunio nasutus, the eastern pondmussel, is a species of freshwater mussel in the family Unionidae, the river mussels.

This species is native to the eastern United States and Ontario, Canada. Only two populations are known from Canada. Like many Unionoid mussels, female eastern pondmussels display a lure to attract their fish hosts (see video, right).

References

 Say, T. (1817). Conchology. - In: Nicholson, W.: American edition of the British Encyclopedia, or, dictionary of arts and sciences comprising an accurate and popular view of the present improved state of human knowledge. First Edition, A-3 - C-6 [= 1-20], pl. [1-4]. page(s): [unpaginated], pl. 4 fig. 1
 Watters, G.T. (2018). A preliminary review of the nominal genus Villosa of freshwater mussels (Bivalvia, Unionidae) in North America. Visaya. Suppl. 10: 3-139.

nasutus
Molluscs of the United States
Molluscs of Canada
Articles containing video clips
Bivalves described in 1817
Taxobox binomials not recognized by IUCN
Taxa named by Thomas Say